Persekam Metro Football Club (sometimes known as Persekam Malang and Metro FC) is an Indonesian football club based in Malang Regency, East Java. They play in the Liga 3.

History
They won 2009–10 Liga Indonesia First Division
after beating Persemalra Maluku Tenggara, 4-1 in penalty shootout at Singaperbangsa Stadium.
They got relegated to Liga 3 in 2017. This ended their seven-years stay in the Liga 2.

Honours 
 Liga Indonesia First Division
 Champion: 2009–10

Affiliated Clubs
 Arema F.C.

References

External links
 

 
Football clubs in Indonesia
Football clubs in East Java
Association football clubs established in 1970
1970 establishments in Indonesia